Presidential elections were held in Austria in 1951, the first time that the President of Austria had been elected by popular vote. A first round of voting was held on 6 May, and with no candidate achieving a majority of the votes, a second round was held on 27 May between the top two candidates, Mayor of Vienna, Theodor Körner representing the Socialist Party's, and Upper Austria Governor Heinrich Gleißner of the Austrian People's Party. Although Gleißner received the most votes in the first round Körner won the runoff with 52% of the vote.

Background
A constitutional amendment in 1929 would have seen the president being elected directly, but a planned election in 1931 was cancelled and the president was instead elected by Parliament as a public vote was deemed too expensive. After the suspension of the constitution in 1934, and Austria ceasing to exist in 1938, the first presidential elections by popular vote were to be held in 1945. However, because the Allied council did not approve on the constitutional law passed by the National Council, the election was again held by the Federal Assembly.

Results

References

Presidential elections in Austria
President
Austria